Priol is a village in central Goa, in western India.

It is situated in Ponda Taluka, north of the city of Ponda. The Mangueshi Temple is located northwest of the village. From Mardol, Priol is around 2 km, Mardol is on Panaji-Ponda highway. It is 7 km from Ponda or 22 km from Panaji.

The famous Kelekar family is from Priol and their famous ancestral KELEKAR HOUSE is located near Betal Temple. Another Kelekar House is situated at Nagar near Village Panchayat, which was constructed in the year 1937 by father of writer, Ravindra Kelekar.

Government and politics
Priol is part of Priol (Goa Assembly constituency) and North Goa (Lok Sabha constituency). As of 2017, its representative in the Goa Legislative Assembly is Govind Gaude.

References

Villages in North Goa district